The ISU World Development Trophy is an international figure skating competition. It may be held twice each year, on different continents, during April. Medals are awarded in men's and ladies' singles.

Medalists

Men

Ladies

References 

Figure skating in Malaysia
International figure skating competitions hosted by Poland